Environmental degradation is the deterioration of the environment through depletion of resources such as quality of air, water and soil; the destruction of ecosystems; habitat destruction; the extinction of wildlife; and pollution. It is defined as any change or disturbance to the environment perceived to be deleterious or undesirable.

Environmental concerns can be defined as the negative effects of any human activity on the environment. The biological as well as the physical features of the environment are included. Some of the primary environmental challenges that are causing great worry are air pollution, water pollution, natural environment pollution, rubbish pollution, and so on.

Environmental degradation is one of the ten threats officially cautioned by the High-level Panel on Threats, Challenges and Change of the United Nations. The United Nations International Strategy for Disaster Reduction defines environmental degradation as "the reduction of the capacity of the environment to meet social and ecological objectives, and needs". Environmental degradation comes in many types. When natural habitats are destroyed or natural resources are depleted, the environment is degraded. Efforts to counteract this problem include environmental protection and environmental resources management. Mismanagement that leads to degradation can also lead to environmental conflict where communities organize in opposition to the forces that mismanaged the environment.

Biodiversity loss 

Scientists assert that human activity has pushed the earth into a sixth mass extinction event. The loss of biodiversity has been attributed in particular to human overpopulation, continued human population growth and overconsumption of natural resources by the world's wealthy. A 2020 report by the World Wildlife Fund found that human activity – specifically overconsumption, population growth and intensive farming – has destroyed 68% of vertebrate wildlife since 1970. The Global Assessment Report on Biodiversity and Ecosystem Services, published by the United Nation's IPBES in 2019, posits that roughly one million species of plants and animals face extinction from anthropogenic causes, such as expanding human land use for industrial agriculture and livestock rearing, along with overfishing.

Since the establishment of agriculture over 11,000 years ago, humans have altered roughly 70% of the earth's land surface, with the global biomass of vegetation being reduced by half, and terrestrial animal communities seeing a decline in biodiversity greater than 20% on average. A 2021 study says that just 3% of the planet's terrestrial surface is ecologically and faunally intact, meaning areas with healthy populations of native animal species and little to no human footprint. Many of these intact ecosystems were in areas inhabited by indigenous peoples.

The implications of these losses for human livelihoods and wellbeing have raised serious concerns. With regard to the agriculture sector for example, The State of the World’s Biodiversity for Food and Agriculture, published by the Food and Agriculture Organization of the United Nations in 2019, states that “countries report that many species that contribute to vital ecosystem services, including pollinators, the natural enemies of pests, soil organisms and wild food species, are in decline as a consequence of the destruction and degradation of habitats, overexploitation, pollution and other threats” and that “key ecosystems that deliver numerous services essential to food and agriculture, including supply of freshwater, protection against hazards and provision of habitat for species such as fish and pollinators, are declining.”

Impacts of environmental degradation on women’s livelihoods 
On the way biodiversity loss and ecosystem degradation impact livelihoods, the Food and Agriculture Organization of the United Nations finds also that in contexts of degraded lands and ecosystems in rural areas, both girls and women bear heavier workloads.

Women's livelihoods, health, food and nutrition security, access to water and energy, and coping abilities are all disproportionately affected by environmental degradation. Environmental pressures and shocks, particularly in rural areas, force women to deal with the aftermath, greatly increasing their load of unpaid care work.

This implies, for example, longer journeys to get primary necessities and greater exposure to the risks of human trafficking, rape, and sexual violence.

Water degradation 

One major component of environmental degradation is the depletion of the resource of fresh water on Earth.  Approximately only 2.5% of all of the water on Earth is fresh water, with the rest being salt water. 69% of fresh water is frozen in ice caps located on Antarctica and Greenland, so only 30% of the 2.5% of fresh water 
is available for consumption.  Fresh water is an exceptionally important resource, since life on Earth is ultimately dependent on it. Water transports nutrients, minerals and chemicals within the biosphere to all forms of life, sustains both plants and animals, and moulds the surface of the Earth with transportation and deposition of materials.

The current top three uses of fresh water account for 95% of its consumption; approximately 85% is used for irrigation of farmland, golf courses, and parks, 6% is used for domestic purposes such as indoor bathing uses and outdoor garden and lawn use, and 4% is used for industrial purposes such as processing, washing, and cooling in manufacturing centres.  It is estimated that one in three people over the entire globe are already facing water shortages, almost one-fifth of the world population live in areas of physical water scarcity, and almost one quarter of the world's population live in a developing country that lacks the necessary infrastructure to use water from available rivers and aquifers.  Water scarcity is an increasing problem due to many foreseen issues in the future including population growth, increased urbanization, higher standards of living, and climate change.

Industrial and domestic sewage, pesticides, fertilizers, plankton blooms, silt, oils, chemical residues, radioactive material, and other pollutants are some of the most frequent water pollutants. These have a huge negative impact on the water and can cause degradation in various levels.

Climate change and temperature 

Climate change affects the Earth's water supply in a large number of ways. It is predicted that the mean global temperature will rise in the coming years due to a number of forces affecting the climate. The amount of atmospheric carbon dioxide (CO2) will rise, and both of these will influence water resources; evaporation depends strongly on temperature and moisture availability which can ultimately affect the amount of water available to replenish groundwater supplies.

Transpiration from plants can be affected by a rise in atmospheric CO2, which can decrease their use of water, but can also raise their use of water from possible increases of leaf area. Temperature rise can reduce the snow season in the winter and increase the intensity of the melting snow leading to peak runoff of this, affecting soil moisture, flood and drought risks, and storage capacities depending on the area.

Warmer winter temperatures cause a decrease in snowpack, which can result in diminished water resources during summer. This is especially important at mid-latitudes and in mountain regions that depend on glacial runoff to replenish their river systems and groundwater supplies, making these areas increasingly vulnerable to water shortages over time; an increase in temperature will initially result in a rapid rise in water melting from glaciers in the summer, followed by a retreat in glaciers and a decrease in the melt and consequently the water supply every year as the size of these glaciers get smaller and smaller.

Thermal expansion of water and increased melting of oceanic glaciers from an increase in temperature gives way to a rise in sea level. This can affect the freshwater supply to coastal areas as well. As river mouths and deltas with higher salinity get pushed further inland, an intrusion of saltwater results in an increase of salinity in reservoirs and aquifers. Sea-level rise may also consequently be caused by a depletion of groundwater, as climate change can affect the hydrologic cycle in a number of ways. Uneven distributions of increased temperatures and increased precipitation around the globe results in water surpluses and deficits, but a global decrease in groundwater suggests a rise in sea level, even after meltwater and thermal expansion were accounted for, which can provide a positive feedback to the problems sea-level rise causes to fresh-water supply.

A rise in air temperature results in a rise in water temperature, which is also very significant in water degradation as the water would become more susceptible to bacterial growth. An increase in water temperature can also affect ecosystems greatly because of a species' sensitivity to temperature, and also by inducing changes in a body of water's self-purification system from decreased amounts of dissolved oxygen in the water due to rises in temperature.

Climate change and precipitation 

A rise in global temperatures is also predicted to correlate with an increase in global precipitation but because of increased runoff, floods, increased rates of soil erosion, and mass movement of land, a decline in water quality is probable, because while water will carry more nutrients it will also carry more contaminants. While most of the attention about climate change is directed towards global warming and greenhouse effect, some of the most severe effects of climate change are likely to be from changes in precipitation, evapotranspiration, runoff, and soil moisture.  It is generally expected that, on average, global precipitation will increase, with some areas receiving increases and some decreases.

Climate models show that while some regions should expect an increase in precipitation, such as in the tropics and higher latitudes, other areas are expected to see a decrease, such as in the subtropics. This will ultimately cause a latitudinal variation in water distribution. The areas receiving more precipitation are also expected to receive this increase during their winter and actually become drier during their summer, creating even more of a variation of precipitation distribution.  Naturally, the distribution of precipitation across the planet is very uneven, causing constant variations in water availability in respective locations.

Changes in precipitation affect the timing and magnitude of floods and droughts, shift runoff processes, and alter groundwater recharge rates.  Vegetation patterns and growth rates will be directly affected by shifts in precipitation amount and distribution, which will in turn affect agriculture as well as natural ecosystems.  Decreased precipitation will deprive areas of water causing water tables to fall and reservoirs of wetlands, rivers, and lakes to empty. In addition, a possible increase in evaporation and evapotranspiration will result, depending on the accompanied rise in temperature. Groundwater reserves will be depleted, and the remaining water has a greater chance of being of poor quality from saline or contaminants on the land surface.

Climate change is resulting into a very high rate of land degradation causing enhanced desertification and nutrient deficient soils. The menace of land degradation is increasing by the day and has been characterized as a major global threat. According to Global Assessment of Land Degradation and Improvement (GLADA) a quarter of land area around the globe can now be marked as degraded. Land degradation is supposed to influence lives of 1.5 billion people and 15 billion tons of fertile soil is lost every year due to anthropogenic activities and climate change.

Population growth 

The human population on Earth is expanding rapidly, which together with even more rapid economic growth is the main cause of the degradation of the environment. Humanity's appetite for resources is disrupting the environment's natural equilibrium. Production industries are venting smoke into the atmosphere and discharging chemicals that are polluting water resources. The smoke includes detrimental gases such as carbon monoxide and sulphur dioxide. The high levels of pollution in the atmosphere form layers that are eventually absorbed into the atmosphere. Organic compounds such as chlorofluorocarbons (CFCs) have generated an opening in the ozone layer, which admits higher levels of ultraviolet radiation, putting the globe at risk.

The available fresh water being affected by the climate is also being stretched across an ever-increasing global population. It is estimated that almost a quarter of the global population is living in an area that is using more than 20% of their renewable water supply; water use will rise with population while the water supply is also being aggravated by decreases in streamflow and groundwater caused by climate change. Even though some areas may see an increase in freshwater supply from an uneven distribution of precipitation increase, an increased use of water supply is expected.

An increased population means increased withdrawals from the water supply for domestic, agricultural, and industrial uses, the largest of these being agriculture, believed to be the major non-climate driver of environmental change and water deterioration.  The next 50 years will likely be the last period of rapid agricultural expansion, but the larger and wealthier population over this time will demand more agriculture.

Population increase over the last two decades, at least in the United States, has also been accompanied by a shift to an increase in urban areas from rural areas, which concentrates the demand for water into certain areas, and puts stress on the fresh water supply from industrial and human contaminants. Urbanization causes overcrowding and increasingly unsanitary living conditions, especially in developing countries, which in turn exposes an increasingly number of people to disease.  About 79% of the world's population is in developing countries, which lack access to sanitary water and sewer systems, giving rises to disease and deaths from contaminated water and increased numbers of disease-carrying insects.

Agriculture 

Agriculture is dependent on available soil moisture, which is directly affected by climate dynamics, with precipitation being the input in this system and various processes being the output, such as evapotranspiration, surface runoff, drainage, and percolation into groundwater.  Changes in climate, especially the changes in precipitation and evapotranspiration predicted by climate models, will directly affect soil moisture, surface runoff, and groundwater recharge.

In areas with decreasing precipitation as predicted by the climate models, soil moisture may be substantially reduced.  With this in mind, agriculture in most areas already needs irrigation, which depletes fresh water supplies both by the physical use of the water and the degradation agriculture causes to the water. Irrigation increases salt and nutrient content in areas that would not normally be affected, and damages streams and rivers from damming and removal of water. Fertilizer enters both human and livestock waste streams that eventually enter groundwater, while nitrogen, phosphorus, and other chemicals from fertilizer can acidify both soils and water.
Certain agricultural demands may increase more than others with an increasingly wealthier global population, and meat is one commodity expected to double global food demand by 2050, which directly affects the global supply of fresh water.  Cows need water to drink, more if the temperature is high and humidity is low, and more if the production system the cow is in is extensive, since finding food takes more effort.  Water is needed in the processing of the meat, and also in the production of feed for the livestock. Manure can contaminate bodies of freshwater, and slaughterhouses, depending on how well they are managed, contribute waste such as blood, fat, hair, and other bodily contents to supplies of fresh water.

The transfer of water from agricultural to urban and suburban use raises concerns about agricultural sustainability, rural socioeconomic decline, food security, an increased carbon footprint from imported food, and decreased foreign trade balance.  The depletion of fresh water, as applied to more specific and populated areas, increases fresh water scarcity among the population and also makes populations susceptible to economic, social, and political conflict in a number of ways; rising sea levels forces migration from coastal areas to other areas farther inland, pushing populations closer together breaching borders and other geographical patterns, and agricultural surpluses and deficits from the availability of water induce trade problems and economies of certain areas. Climate change is an important cause of involuntary migration and forced displacement According to the Food and Agriculture Organization of the United Nations, global greenhouse gas emissions from animal agriculture exceeds that of transportation.

Water management 

Water management is the process of planning, developing, and managing water resources across all water applications, in terms of both quantity and quality." Water management is supported and guided by institutions, infrastructure, incentives, and information systems

 The issue of the depletion of fresh water has stimulated increased efforts in water management.  While water management systems are often flexible, adaptation to new hydrologic conditions may be very costly.  Preventative approaches are necessary to avoid high costs of inefficiency and the need for rehabilitation of water supplies, and innovations to decrease overall demand may be important in planning water sustainability.

Water supply systems, as they exist now, were based on the assumptions of the current climate, and built to accommodate existing river flows and flood frequencies.  Reservoirs are operated based on past hydrologic records, and irrigation systems on historical temperature, water availability, and crop water requirements; these may not be a reliable guide to the future. Re-examining engineering designs, operations, optimizations, and planning, as well as re-evaluating legal, technical, and economic approaches to manage water resources are very important for the future of water management in response to water degradation. Another approach is water privatization; despite its economic and cultural effects, service quality and overall quality of the water can be more easily controlled and distributed.  Rationality and sustainability is appropriate, and requires limits to overexploitation and pollution and efforts in conservation.

See also 

 Anthropocene
 Environmental change
 Environmental issues
 Ecological collapse
 Ecologically sustainable development
 Eco-socialism
 Exploitation of natural resources
 Human impact on the environment
 I=PAT
 Restoration ecology
 United Nations Decade on Biodiversity
 United Nations Development Programme (UNDP)
 United Nations Environment Programme (UNEP)
 World Resources Institute (WRI)

Sources

References

External links 
 Ecology of Increasing Disease Population growth and environmental degradation
 Environmental Change in the Kalahari: Integrated Land Degradation Studies for Nonequilibrium Dryland Environments in the Annals of the Association of American Geographers
 Public Daily Brief Threat: Environmental Degradation
 Focus: Environmental degradation is contributing to health threats worldwide
 Environmental Degradation of Materials in Nuclear Systems-Water Reactors
Herndon and Gibbon Lieutenants United States Navy The First North American Explorers of the Amazon Valley, by Historian Normand E. Klare. Actual Reports from the explorers are compared with present Amazon Basin conditions.
Environmental Degradation Index by Jha & Murthy (for 174 countries)

Environmental issues